The Aghdam Tea House was a public building in the city of Aghdam, Azerbaijan. It was one of the landmarks of the city.

History 
The tea house was based on the idea of the academician Khudu Mammadov during Sadig Murtuzayev's  post as first Secretary of the Agdam District Party Committee of the Central Committee of the Azerbaijan SSR. Naik Samadov was chief architect of the Tea House project. In the project, masonry was only used on the first floor. The remainder consisted of metal construction. It was decided to place the tea house near the mosque after discussion with Khudu Mammadov. Penal labor was used to reduce construction costs.
The tea house was inaugurated on 26 July 1986. In addition to the regional officials, Vafa Guluzade, the head of the Culture Department of the CP CC of Azerbaijan SSR, also participated in the opening ceremony. The article published in the July 31, 1986, issue of "The Lenin Path", on the occasion of the opening of the tea house, reads:

Design
A large diameter pipe was placed in the middle of the tea house. On each side, small volumes of tubes were merged with structures. Floors were wooden. Pipes were embellished with wood and decorated with various ornaments. Each floor had four doors. The dome of the tea house was roofed with galvanized iron.

Tea house in Kuzanly 

On May 10, 2015, a copy of the tea house was built in Guzanli settlement of Aghdam region.

Gallery

References

Demolished buildings and structures in Azerbaijan